Padraig Rushe is an Irish-born entrepreneur, business consultant and musician.  He is the Founder/Managing Director of Initiative Ireland, a peer-to-peer lending company, which is currently in development. Rushe has held roles in Royal Bank of Scotland (Ulster Bank), Bank of Ireland and GE Money in addition to his own companies. He also served as Chief Commercial Officer of a Medical Device Company. A graduate of Trinity College Dublin, he earned his MBA in 2013. He also holds a BA Honours from University College Dublin.

Outside of his business career, Rushe spent years as a musician. He is a former member of the Dublin Gospel Choir, with whom he released 3 albums. In May 2008, he was featured on MTV's "Get Seen Get Heard: Contenders". In 2009 he recorded and released his own solo album GreyWold, on his own independent record and management label Loud Child.

Recording catalogue
DUBLIN GOSPEL CHOIR – "NIGHTS OF SOUL" (2003)
DUBLIN GOSPEL CHOIR – "DGC LIVE" (2004)
TODAY FM's – "EVEN BETTER THAN THE REAL THING II" (2004)
DUBLIN GOSPEL CHOIR – "MOVING ON" (2006)
BUPA IRELAND – "IN JURUESELUM" TV Advert(2007)
PADDY CASEY – "ADDICTED TO COMPANY" (2008)
PADRAIG RUSHE – Gonna be a Change(2009)
PADRAIG RUSHE – Greyworld (2009)
PADRAIG RUSHE – New House Rising (2009)

Notes

References

Living people
1982 births
21st-century Irish male singers